Alexios Michail (born 18 August 1986) is a Greek professional footballer who plays as a centre back.

Career

PAS Giannina 
At the age of 6, Michail started playing football at PAS Giannina. In 2004 he signed his first contract with PAS Giannina. He was part of PAS Giannina for 15 years, except two periods of loan. He was the captain and the footballer who scored the first European goal.

Michail went on loan to Lamia F.C. and Panserraikos F.C. early in his football career.

References

External links
Profile at EPAE.org

1986 births
Living people
Greek footballers
PAS Giannina F.C. players
Panserraikos F.C. players
PAS Lamia 1964 players
Athlitiki Enosi Larissa F.C. players
Association football defenders
Footballers from Ioannina